La Calle del pecado is a 1954 Argentine film.

Cast and Crew
 Director: Ernesto Arancibia
 Writers: Ernesto Arancibia, Alexis de Arancibia
 Stars: Juan Alighieri, Héctor Armendáriz and Cayetano Biondo

External links
 

1954 films
1950s Spanish-language films
Argentine black-and-white films
Argentine drama films
1954 drama films
1950s Argentine films